According to Law is a 1919 German silent film directed by Willy Grunwald and starring Asta Nielsen. It was inspired by Dostoevsky's Crime and Punishment.

Cast
 Georgine Sobjeska as Widow Waler
 Asta Nielsen as Sonja Waler - Journalist - the Widow's Daughter
 Otz Tollen as Dr. Erich Waler - Her Son
 Theodor Loos as Albert Holm, inventor
 Fritz Hartwig as Arthur Wolf - journalist
 Willy Kaiser-Heyl as Professor Wedel
 Henri Peters-Arnolds as Wedel's Son
 Guido Herzfeld as Heere - Loan Shark
 Bernhard Goetzke

References

Bibliography

External links

1919 films
Films of the Weimar Republic
German silent feature films
German black-and-white films
1910s German films